Mira Golub (born 24 September 1975, Yelizovo, Kamchatka Oblast, Soviet Union) is a Russian former alpine skier who competed in the 1994 Winter Olympics.

References

1975 births
Living people
Russian female alpine skiers
Olympic alpine skiers of Russia
Alpine skiers at the 1994 Winter Olympics
People from Yelizovo